Kaukės (Masks) is a Lithuanian reality singing competition television series based on the Masked Singer franchise which originated from the South Korean version of the show King of Mask Singer. Production was announced in November 2019. The first season premiered on LNK on 13 September 2020.

Production
A group of celebrities compete anonymously on stage, singing in full costumes over a series of episodes. The competing celebrities have to sign strict confidentiality agreement and they can't tell anybody (their friends and families) that they are competing in project Kaukės. During interviews their voices are distorted by special programs and they only sing as best as they can without any special effects. Each episode, a portion of the competitors are paired off into face-off competitions, in which each will perform a song of his or her choice. From each face-off, the panelists vote: the winner's safe for the week, while the loser is put up for elimination. At the end of the episode, the losers of the face-offs are then subjected to new votes of the panelists to determine who will not continue; the eliminated singer then enters the stage where it turns its back to the camera, takes off its mask, then turns around to reveal his/her identity.

In addition to the singing competition, hints to each masked singer's identity are offered during the show. Pre-taped interviews are given as hints and feature the celebrities' distorted voices. The panelists are given time to speculate the identity of the singer after the performance and ask them a single question, or the contestant says a clue about themselves or they bring their things as clues and panelists try to determine their identity. In the first season winner was picked by panelists, in the second panelists had only one option to pick the 3rd place winner and for last two contestants only audience voted and picked the winner. And in the 3rd season only audience voted for all 3 contestants.

The process of contestants getting to the arena is that there are getting messages from the director to there they need to drive to the agreed place. Later there are picked up from that place by guards in a car with tinted windows. Contestants have to put on a black hoodie and black face shield. The arena is cleared that no people can enter there and the contestant is lead to his or her room by guards. They spend whole day in that room and they can't leave that room alone. They have contacts to people that they can only talk to. Only 5 people know who competes in the project. Then the time comes for contestant to perform they put on their costumes (there are helped by stylists to put on costumes) and they go to stage to perform.

Costumes
The costumes are partly replicates that were used in other international versions as well as national motives such as Šakotis.

Panelists and host
 
Popular actor and comedian Giedrius Savickas presents the show. The panel includes Vaidotas Valiukevičius, lead-singer of The Roop, radio host Livija Gradauskiene, TV host Indre Kavaliauskaite, fashion designer Aleksandras Pogrebnojus and the basketball players Darju and Krzysztof Lavrinovic.Later on 2 season Aleksandras Pogrebnojus wasn't on the panel anymore. His place took singer Monika Liu. On the 3rd season there was new panel. Monika Liu  continued as panelist and where have been 4 new panelists: singer Vidas Bareikis, singer and winner of Kaukės 1 season Rūta Ščiogolevaitė, influencer Paul de Miko and designer Robertas Kalinkinas.

Guest masks & panelists
On later episodes guest masks made an appearance by performing a song out of competition at the beginning of the show. The panel then gave their guesses before an instant reveal. The guests then  occasionally joined the panel for the ongoing episode.

Season synopsis

Season 1 (2020)

Episodes

Episode 1 (13 September)

Episode 2 (19 September)

Episode 3 (27 September)

Episode 4 (11 October)

Episode 5 (18 October)

Episode 6 (25 October)

Episode 7 (1 November)

Episode 8 (8 November)

Episode 9 (22 November)

Episode 10 - Semi-final (29 November) 
 Group performance: "A Little Party Never Killed Nobody (All We Got)" by Fergie, Q-Tip, and GoonRock

Episode 11 - Finale (6 December)

Season 2 (2021)

Episodes

Episode 1 (12 September)

Episode 2 (19 September)

Episode 3 (26 September)

Episode 4 (3 October)

Episode 5 (10 October)

Episode 6 (17 October)

Episode 7 (24 October)

Episode 8 (31 October)

Episode 9 (7 November)

Episode 10 Semi-Final (14 November) 
 Group performance: "High Hopes" by Panic! at the Disco

Episode 11 - Finale (21 November)

Season 3 (2022)

Episodes

Episode 1 (11 September)

Episode 2 (18 September)

Episode 3 (25 September)

Episode 4 (2 October)

Episode 5 (9 October)

Episode 6 (16 October)

Episode 7 (23 October)

Episode 8 (30 October)

Episode 9 (6 November)

Episode 10 (13 November)

Episode 11 (20 November)

Episode 12 (27 November)

Episode 13 - Semi-final (4 December) 
 Group performance: "Dschinghis Khan m" by Vee Sing Zone

Episode 14 - Finale (11 December)

References

External links
 
 

Masked Singer
2020 Lithuanian television series debuts
LNK (television station) original programming
Lithuanian television series based on South Korean television series